Fred Melvin McGaha (September 26, 1926 – February 3, 2002) was an American coach and manager in Major League Baseball as well as a professional basketball player. McGaha graduated from the University of Arkansas and played a season of professional basketball with the New York Knicks of the NBA.

Manager of Indians and Athletics
He signed his first baseball contract with the St. Louis Cardinals in 1948. An outfielder who batted and threw right-handed, McGaha never played in the Major Leagues. However, he achieved great success as a minor league manager. At 27, he became a playing skipper in 1954 in the Double-A Texas League, leading the Shreveport Sports to 90 victories and a regular-season pennant in his first season, and then to 87 wins and a playoff title the following year.  In 1959, his Mobile Bears won the Double-A Southern Association championship and 89 regular-season games. Then, in 1960, McGaha led the Triple-A Toronto Maple Leafs to 100 victories and the International League's Governors' Cup playoff championship. 

McGaha was fired with two games remaining in his maiden season with Cleveland at 78–82 in sixth place in the ten-team American League. 
 
In 1963, McGaha became a coach for the Kansas City Athletics. In June 1964, with the Athletics in last place under manager Eddie Lopat, owner Charlie Finley, known for his quick trigger finger in hiring and firing, abruptly shifted McGaha into the Kansas City front office; then, a few days later, moved him back onto the field as Lopat's successor. The A's revived somewhat, but still finished in last place. McGaha was fired by Finley in on May 15, 1965, season after a 5–21 start; on that day, his team was still locked in the league basement, 13 games out of the lead. He was replaced by Haywood Sullivan.

In part of three seasons as a Major League manager, McGaha posted a 123–173 record (.416). Following his big-league managing career, he worked for the Houston Astros as pilot of the Triple-A Oklahoma City 89ers (1966–67) and MLB first-base coach (1968–70).

Managerial record

Basketball coach
In addition to his baseball managing, McGaha also spent two years as the head men's basketball coach at Arkansas A&M College (now the University of Arkansas at Monticello), serving as the head coach in 1953-54 and 1954–55. He posted a 32–15 (.681) record during his two years as the Boll Weevils' head coach.

Personal life
McGaha was a member of the 1948 Duluth Dukes and was one of the survivors of a July 24 bus crash in which four players and their manager were killed in a head-on accident with a truck.

He died in Tulsa, Oklahoma, at age 75.

BAA career statistics

Regular season

Playoffs

References

External links
Baseball-Reference.com – career managing record
NBA statistics @ basketballreference.com
Historic Baseball

1926 births
2002 deaths
American men's basketball players
Arkansas–Monticello Boll Weevils basketball coaches
Arkansas Razorbacks baseball players
Arkansas Razorbacks men's basketball players
Baseball players from Louisiana
Basketball coaches from Louisiana
Basketball players from Louisiana
Cleveland Indians coaches
Cleveland Indians managers
Columbus Red Birds players
Duluth Dukes players
Houston Astros coaches
Houston Buffaloes players
Kansas City Athletics coaches
Kansas City Athletics managers
Major League Baseball first base coaches
Major League Baseball third base coaches
Mobile Bears players
New York Knicks draft picks
New York Knicks players
People from Bastrop, Louisiana
Point guards
Shreveport Sports players
Toronto Maple Leafs (International League) managers
Winston-Salem Cardinals players